Freeke Moes (born 29 November 1998) is a Dutch field hockey player.

Career

Club Hockey
Freeke Moes plays club hockey for Amsterdamsche Hockey & Bandy Club in the Dutch Hoofdklasse.

Junior National Teams

Under–18
In 2016, Moes made her first appearance for a Dutch junior team at the EuroHockey Youth Championships in Cork, Ireland. The Dutch Under–18 team won the tournament, with Moes scoring twice during the campaign.

Under–21
Moes made her debut for the national Under–21 team in 2017 at the EuroHockey Junior Championships in Valencia, Spain. The Dutch team won gold at the tournament after defeating Belgium 6–0.

In 2019, Moes represented the Dutch side again at another EuroHockey Junior Championship, this time as captain. The Netherlands lost the final 3–4 in penalties to the hosts, Spain.

Senior National Team
In December 2018, Netherlands head coach Alyson Annan named Moes in the 32 player national squad for the 2019 FIH Pro League. Moes went on to make her senior international debut during the tournament in a match against the United States on 16 February.

She was included in the Netherlands squad for the women's field hockey tournament at the 2020 Summer Olympics, held in July and August 2021. Though designated as a alternate player, due to rule changes caused by the COVID-19 pandemic she was eligible to compete in all matches (unlike previous tournaments, in which alternates could only compete after permanently replacing an injured player). Though the Netherlands earned the gold medal, she did not make an appearance and was therefore ineligible to receive a medal.

International Goals

References

1998 births
Living people
Dutch female field hockey players
Field hockey players at the 2020 Summer Olympics
Olympic field hockey players of the Netherlands